The Lord of the Rings: Gollum is an upcoming action-adventure video game developed by Daedalic Entertainment and co-published by Daedalic Entertainment and Nacon. It is based on the works of J. R. R. Tolkien, following the character of Gollum between the events of The Hobbit and The Lord of the Rings. The game is scheduled for release for Microsoft Windows, PlayStation 4, PlayStation 5, Nintendo Switch, Xbox One and Xbox Series X/S.

Release 
The game was announced by Daedalic Entertainment in March 2019 for release in 2021. With the Nacon agreement announcement, the game was delayed to 2022. On 24 May 2022, it was announced on the game's official Twitter page that the developers were currently targeting a release date of September 1, 2022 for the Steam service and PlayStation and Xbox consoles. The Nintendo Switch version was announced to be coming on November 30, 2022. On July 25, 2022, the developers announced a further delay of "a few months".  Several months later, after missing its planned 2022 release dates, Nacon announced on January 24, 2023 that Gollum is now targeting a release for next spring or summer.

References 

Upcoming video games scheduled for 2023
Action-adventure games
Nacon games
Daedalic Entertainment games
Fantasy video games
Nintendo Switch games
PlayStation 4 games
PlayStation 5 games
Single-player video games
Stealth video games
Unreal Engine games
Video games based on Middle-earth
Video games based on novels
Video games developed in Germany
Windows games
Xbox One games
Xbox Series X and Series S games